Micrurus is a genus of venomous coral snakes of the family Elapidae.

Geographic range
Species in the genus Micrurus are endemic to the Americas.

Species
The following 83 species are recognized as being valid.
Micrurus albicinctus Amaral, 1925
Micrurus alleni K. Schmidt, 1936
Micrurus altirostris (Cope, 1860)
Micrurus ancoralis Jan, 1872
Micrurus annellatus W. Peters, 1871
Micrurus averyi K. Schmidt, 1939
Micrurus baliocoryphus (Cope, 1862)
Micrurus bernadi (Cope, 1887)
Micrurus bocourti (Jan, 1872)
Micrurus bogerti Roze, 1967
Micrurus boicora 
Micrurus brasiliensis Roze, 1967
Micrurus browni K. Schmidt & H.M. Smith, 1943
Micrurus carvalhoi Roze, 1967
Micrurus camilae Renjifo & Lundberg, 2003
Micrurus circinalis (A.M.C. Duméril, Bibron & A.H.A. Duméril, 1854)
Micrurus clarki K. Schmidt, 1936
Micrurus collaris (Schlegel, 1837)
Micrurus corallinus (Merrem, 1820)
Micrurus decoratus (Jan, 1858)
Micrurus diana Roze, 1983
Micrurus diastema (A.M.C. Duméril, Bibron & A.H.A. Duméril, 1854)
Micrurus dissoleucus Cope, 1860
Micrurus distans Kennicott, 1860
Micrurus diutius Burger, 1955
Micrurus dumerilii Jan, 1858
Micrurus elegans Jan, 1858
Micrurus ephippifer (Cope, 1886)
Micrurus filiformis (Günther, 1859)
Micrurus frontalis A.M.C. Duméril, Bibron & A.H.A. Duméril, 1854
Micrurus frontifasciatus (F. Werner, 1927)
Micrurus fulvius (Linnaeus, 1766)
Micrurus helleri K. Schmidt & F. Schmidt, 1925
Micrurus hemprichii (Jan, 1858)
Micrurus hippocrepis (W. Peters, 1862)
Micrurus ibiboboca (Merrem, 1820)
Micrurus isozonus (Cope, 1860)
Micrurus langsdorffi (Wagler, 1824)
Micrurus laticollaris W. Peters, 1870
Micrurus latifasciatus K. Schmidt, 1933
Micrurus lemniscatus (Linnaeus, 1758)
Micrurus limbatus Fraser, 1964
Micrurus margaritiferus Roze, 1967
Micrurus medemi Roze, 1967
Micrurus meridensis Roze, 1989
Micrurus mertensi K. Schmidt, 1936
Micrurus mipartitus (A.M.C. Duméril, Bibron & A.H.A. Duméril, 1854)
Micrurus mosquitensis K. Schmidt, 1933
Micrurus multifasciatus Jan, 1858
Micrurus multiscutatus Rendahl & Vestergren, 1941
Micrurus narduccii (Jan, 1863)
Micrurus nattereri K. Schmidt, 1952
Micrurus nebularis Roze, 1989
Micrurus nigrocinctus (Girard, 1854)
Micrurus obscurus (Jan, 1872)
Micrurus oligoanellatus Ayerbe & López, 2002
Micrurus ornatissimus (Jan, 1858)
Micrurus pacaraimae Morato de Carvalho, 2002
Micrurus pachecogili Campbell, 2000
Micrurus paraensis da Cunha & Nascimento, 1973
Micrurus peruvianus K. Schmidt, 1936
Micrurus petersi Roze, 1967
Micrurus potyguara Pires, da Silva Jr., Feitosa, Costa-Prudente, Pereira Filho & Zaher, 2014
Micrurus proximans H.M. Smith & Chrapliwy, 1958
Micrurus psyches (Daudin, 1803)
Micrurus putumayensis Lancini, 1962
Micrurus pyrrhocryptus (Cope, 1862)
Micrurus remotus Roze, 1987
Micrurus renjifoi (Lamar, 2003)
Micrurus ruatanus (Günther, 1895)
Micrurus sangilensis Nicéforo Maria, 1942
Micrurus scutiventris (Cope, 1869)
Micrurus serranus Harvey, Aparicio & Gonzáles, 2003
Micrurus silviae Di-Bernardo, Borges-Martins & da Silva Jr., 2007
Micrurus spixii Wagler, 1824
Micrurus spurrelli (Boulenger, 1914)
Micrurus steindachneri (F. Werner, 1901)
Micrurus stewarti Barbour & Amaral, 1928
Micrurus stuarti Roze, 1967
Micrurus surinamensis (Cuvier, 1817)
Micrurus tener Baird & Girard, 1853
Micrurus tikuna Feitosa, da Silva Jr, Pires, Zaher & Costa-Prudente, 2015
Micrurus tricolor (Hoge, 1956)
Micrurus tschudii Jan, 1858

Nota bene: A binomial authority in parentheses indicates that the species was originally described in a genus other than Micrurus.

Reproduction
All species of Micrurus are oviparous (egg-laying).

References

Further reading
Roze JA (1996). Coral Snakes of the Americas: Biology, Identification, and Venoms. Malabar, Florida: Krieger Publishing. 340 pp. .

 
Snake genera
Taxa named by Johann Georg Wagler